The Smiler is a steel roller coaster located at Alton Towers in Staffordshire, United Kingdom. Manufactured by Gerstlauer, it opened in 2013 as the world's first Gerstlauer Infinity Coaster. It is located in the X-Sector area of the park. With 14 inversions, The Smiler holds the world record for most inversions on a roller coaster.

History
Plans to build The Smiler were submitted the local authority in December 2011. Permission was granted on 15 March 2012 following a Staffordshire Moorlands Council meeting, despite some local opposition to its construction. Gerstlauer, a German manufacturing company, was hired to build the roller coaster. Less than a month after obtaining permission, Alton Towers launched a website announcing a new ride – codenamed Secret Weapon 7 (SW7) – for the 2013 season. Its codename followed a similar format used for other roller coasters during their teaser campaigns, such as SW4 for Oblivion and SW6 for Thirteen.

In June 2012, a trademark filed by Merlin Entertainments, parent company of Alton Towers, hinted that the new ride would be named The Smiler. On 17 October 2012, a number of facts about the coaster were revealed to the public including its maximum speed, track length, ride time, passengers per train and ride cost. Despite the release, Alton Towers did not announce or confirm the name for the ride.

Construction
The site for the new ride was determined to be an area in the park being occupied by the tent that previously contained the Black Hole, a roller coaster which closed after the 2005 season. The park began dismantling the remaining Black Hole structure on 12 April 2012. The first pieces of track arrived at the park in late October 2012. Sections of track were later moved to the construction site on 6 December 2012.

In January 2013, Alton Towers officially confirmed that the ride would be called The Smiler. In February 2013, the park revealed some of the ride's elements. The trains arrived in March 2013, as Alton Towers began posting images on both Twitter and their official Smiler website. Vertical construction was completed approximately one month later, as the final piece of track was installed at the top of the first lift hill.

Marketing
Marketing for The Smiler started around the same time as construction when, on 11 April 2012, a minisite was launched allowing visitors to register for updates on the ride's progress. A competition to be the first to ride the rollercoaster, at this time codenamed "SW7", started in July. To enter guests were invited to scan a QR Code with their smartphone, which subsequently redirected to Alton Towers Official The Smiler Minisite where guests entered their details.

In September 2012, the park began the second stage of advertisement through the overnight spray painting of a stencil logo (which resembled a smiling face) all over the park. This was followed in October with new boards around the park,  new 'subliminal' advertising on different sections of the main Alton Towers website, and a countdown timer on the Alton Towers mini-site. The countdown timer initially gave a scheduled opening date of 16 March 2013, but was removed however on 4 January 2013, as the ride hit delays.

More overt advertising started in January 2013, when the "Smile" logo was used in various forms across the country. Including billboards in London; ticket barriers at Leeds railway station; projected onto various buildings including Big Ben; and sprayed onto flocks of sheep in areas including Leicestershire, Devon and Perthshire.

The name of the roller coaster, The Smiler, was revealed on 21 January 2013, the Metro newspaper, and the opening date was set as May (previously it was 16 March).

In February 2013 a free game app was released containing a full 3D recreation of the actual ride, and a preview of the rides merchandise was published online.

John Wardley, a ride consultant on the project, confirmed in a radio interview on 19 April 2013 that The Smiler would feature more inversions than any other roller coaster in the world. Although construction had revealed this earlier, the statement was the first official confirmation that The Smiler would break the inversion record. In an earlier interview Wardley had said that The Smiler would have "...5 mind manipulating elements that play around with you on the ride, so it’s more than just a physical rollercoaster."

From early April and throughout May, Alton Towers published videos online giving snippets of the ride's fictional backstory. This was followed by footage of weather presenter Laura Tobin riding The Smiler, live on ITV's Daybreak programme and an advertising campaign on boxes of Krave cereal.

Opening
Initially, The Smiler was expected to make its public debut in March 2013 for the park's opening day, but due to construction delays, the date was pushed back to 23 May 2013. The date had to be pushed back further after technical issues were encountered during testing and a ride incident occurred during its preview event that stranded riders on the lift hill. Following the incident on 17 May 2013, Alton Towers explained on their website that The Smiler would not open on the originally scheduled date due to "unforeseen teething problems."

The ride's delayed opening initially caused controversy as many had booked advance tickets and had stayed at the Alton Towers Hotel in order to be among the first to ride the coaster. However, Alton Towers later announced it would allow those who had made advanced bookings to change their tickets and hotel reservations free of charge. The Smiler eventually opened on 31 May 2013.

Description
A key feature of the ride is the large, metallic spider-like structure that serves as a centrepoint for the coaster track. Called The Marmaliser, it has 5 legs which are responsible for manipulating riders into smiling, in accordance with the theme of the ride. It is also equipped with a wraparound screen that displays themed graphics and video. The roller coaster's track intertwines within the structure, enhancing the experience for riders. Five trains can operate on the ride at once, leading to a theoretical capacity of 1200 riders per hour.

Track elements

Ride experience
The train dispatches from the station, playing audio of a man saying, "Join us!" The train immediately enters into a sweeping drop 180-degrees to the left. Partway through this drop, riders encounter a heartline roll, the ride's first inversion. The train then comes to a stop on block brakes, before ascending the first lift hill. Upon reaching the top, the train drops into another 180-degree right turn before banking into the second inversion, a downward corkscrew. The train drops down into the next two inversions, two consecutive dive loops before travelling over a trimmed airtime hill into the ride's largest element, a Batwing (this element consists of a sidewinder and reverse sidewinder).

The train then travels through another corkscrew before reaching the second set of block brakes, after a brief pause the train ascends the second lift hill, this time at a 90° vertical angle. The train then enters another drop, 180-degrees to the left, banking into a downward corkscrew. Riders then navigate through a sea serpent roll, followed by a short drop into another trimmed airtime hill. the train then dives into a cobra roll.  Upon exiting the cobra roll, the train twists through two consecutive corkscrews before a short left turn into the final brake run. The words "Process complete" are visible to riders as the train returns to the station.

Incidents

The ride has experienced a number of structural and technical issues since its launch. The most serious incident occurred on 2 June 2015, when a loaded train collided with an empty test train, causing serious injuries to a number of riders. An additional train had recently been added to the circuit when an empty train was dispatched for a test run and stalled mid-ride due to a gust of wind. The ride's block system shut down the ride accordingly, but it was overridden by the engineers on duty, as they were unaware there was now an additional train present that had stalled. This allowed the following train, loaded with passengers, to collide with the stalled train.

Two riders sat in the front row required leg amputations. Subsequently, Merlin Entertainments decided to close The Smiler, Saw – The Ride at Thorpe Park, and two other roller coasters at Chessington World of Adventures (all of which have since reopened) while safety protocols and procedures were evaluated. The Health and Safety Executive (HSE) served a Prohibition Notice upon the Smiler, preventing the ride's use until remedial action had been completed. On 27 July 2015, it was stated by Merlin Entertainments chief executive Nick Varney that The Smiler would "not be opening this summer". The Health and Safety Executive (HSE) initiated a criminal investigation.

In the incident's aftermath, Alton Towers and its owner Merlin Entertainments allegedly observed a drop in revenue and visitor numbers, which they claim influenced their decision to eliminate up to 190 jobs at the theme park. Six rides were closed during the 2016 season as a result of the crash. Varney released a public statement stating:

The ride eventually reopened on 19 March 2016 for the start of the 2016 season with additional safety features. Merlin Attractions Operations Ltd was prosecuted by the HSE at North Staffordshire Justice Centre on 22 April 2016, in which the firm pleaded guilty. On 27 September 2016, after a two-day hearing at Stafford Crown Court, Judge Michael Chambers QC fined Merlin Entertainments £5 million; the value of the fine was reduced by one third from £7.5 million as credit for the guilty plea. In September 2018, Vicky Balch and Leah Washington, who lost their legs on the ride after the crash in June 2015, sued Merlin Attractions Operations Ltd for negligence and/or breach of statutory duty.

References

2015 disasters in the United Kingdom

External links

 Official Alton Towers mini-site

Alton Towers
Roller coasters in the United Kingdom
Roller coasters operated by Merlin Entertainments
Tourist attractions in Staffordshire
Buildings and structures in Staffordshire